Wing Commander Richard Gordon Battensby "Dick" Summers,  (18 October 1921 – 7 May 2017) was a Royal Air Force officer who served as an observer during the Battle of Britain, and was one of the last surviving men known as "The Few".

Early life
Summers was born in Beverley, Yorkshire, on 18 October 1921 and was educated at Ermysted's Grammar School in Skipton.

Royal Air Force career
Upon leaving school aged 18, Summers joined the Royal Air Force (RAF). He flew with No. 219 Squadron RAF during the Battle of Britain. After the battle he joined the Ferry Pool and Defence Flight at Takoradi, West Africa. In July 1941, Summers crash-landed on a beach in Liberia. To avoid being captured he walked 48 miles barefoot before taking to the sea, where he was picked up by a passing British merchantman. 

Summers was awarded the Air Force Medal in 1941 for successfully evading capture. He was commissioned in May 1942 and posted back to the UK. On 12 October 1942 he joined No. 1 (Coastal) Operational Training Unit as bomber leader, flying the Lockheed Hudson. Summers was posted to No. 48 Squadron RAF at RAF Gibraltar on 22 May 1943, again as Bombing Leader, and on 1 March 1944 he was posted to be bombing leader at No. 1 APC at RAF Aldergrove. He continued to hold a number of armament office positions until the end of the war.  

From 1953 to 1956, Summers was deputy station commander at RAF Eastleigh, Kenya, during the Mau Mau Uprising. Summers was appointed an Officer of the Order of the British Empire for his "gallant and distinguished services" in 1956. He was promoted to wing commander in 1958, and retired from the RAF in 1968.

Death
Summers died on 7 May 2017, aged 95.

References

External links
 Photographs of the unveiling of a Battle of Britain plaque by Wg Cdr Summers at his old school, November 2010
 Photo of Wg Cdr Summers taken during World War II

1921 births
2017 deaths
Officers of the Order of the British Empire
People educated at Ermysted's Grammar School
Recipients of the Air Force Medal
Royal Air Force officers
The Few
Military personnel from Yorkshire